Year 1074 (MLXXIV) was a common year starting on Wednesday (link will display the full calendar) of the Julian calendar.

Events 
 By place 

 Byzantine Empire 
 Spring – Norman mercenaries, led by Roussel de Bailleul, proclaim John Doukas emperor of the Byzantine Empire. His nephew, Emperor Michael VII (Doukas), forms an alliance with Seljuk chieftain Suleiman ibn Qutulmish, who is raiding in the eastern regions of Anatolia. The Seljuk Turks ambush the Norman forces; Roussel and John are defeated and captured. But a ransom, raised by Roussel's wife, allows him to return to Amaseia.

 Europe 
 February 2 – Treaty of Gerstungen: Emperor Henry IV is forced to restore the peace with Duke Otto of Nordheim (one of the Saxon leaders of the Saxon Rebellion). He signs a treaty in Gerstungen Castle, on the River Werra in Thuringia (modern Germany).
 February 7 – Battle of Montesarchio: Prince Pandulf IV, co-ruler of Benevento, is killed while fighting the Normans in southern Italy.
 March 14 – Battle of Mogyoród: King Solomon is defeated by his cousins, Duke Géza I and Ladislaus I. He is dethroned and Géza becomes the new ruler of Hungary.
 October 21 – The Belgium beer brand Affligem is founded.

 Africa 
 Spring – Badr al-Jamali becomes Chief Wazir (Grand Vizier) and effectively military dictator of the Fatimid Caliphate under Caliph Al-Mustansir Billah in Egypt.

 China 
 Emperor Shen Zong of the Song Dynasty establishes a Marine Office and a Goods Control Bureau north-west of Shanghai, allowing for the loading and unloading of freight.

 By topic 

 Religion 
 Pope Gregory VII temporarily excommunicates the Norman nobleman Robert Guiscard.

Births 
 February 12 – Conrad II, king of Germany (d. 1101)
 September 16 – Al-Musta'li, Fatimid caliph (d. 1101)
 Abu Mansur Mauhub al-Jawaliqi, Arab philologist (d. 1144)
 Edgar (the Valliant), king of Scotland (d. 1107)
 Hugh I, count of Champagne (approximate date)
 Ibn al-Tilmidh, Syriac physician and poet (d. 1165)
 Maud, queen of Scotland (approximate date)

Deaths 
 February 7 – Pandulf IV, Lombard prince
 April 25 – Herman I, margrave of Baden
 May 6 – Dúnán (or Donat), bishop of Dublin
 October 25 – Shōshi, empress of Japan (b. 988)
 Ibn al-Wafid, Andalusian pharmacologist
 Joseph Tarchaneiotes, Byzantine general
 Peter Krešimir IV, king of Croatia (or 1075)
 Ralph IV (or Raoul), French nobleman 
 Wugunai, Chinese chieftain (b. 1021)
 Yang Wenguang, Chinese general

References